Sir George Halsey Perley  (September 12, 1857 – January 4, 1938) was an American-born Canadian politician and diplomat.

Early life

Born in Lebanon, New Hampshire, the son of William Goodhue Perley and Mabel E. Ticknor Stevens, Perley was educated at the Ottawa Grammar School, at St. Paul's School in Concord, New Hampshire, and at Harvard University where he graduated with a Bachelor of Arts degree in 1878. Perley became a partner in the Perley & Pattee, a lumber company in which his father was senior partner. After Perley & Pattee dissolved in 1893, Perley became head of G.H. Perley & Co which had mills at Pointe-Calumet, Quebec and vice president of the Hull Lumber Company, Ltd., which is operating largely on the upper Ottawa. For many years, Perley was vice president of the Canada Atlantic Railway Co., president of the Rideau Club and president of the Ottawa Golf Club. Along with the other heirs of his father, he donated his homestead on Wellington Street for the purpose of establishing a hospital and served as vice president of its Board of Management. In 1900, he was chairman of the Ottawa and Hull Fire Relief Fund, and distributed about $1,000,000 among the sufferers by the 1900 Hull–Ottawa fire.

Perley married Annie Hespeler Bowlby in Kitchener, Ontario on  4 June 1884. Perley had two children: Mabel, born 8 July 1885 and died 13 March 1887, and Ethel Lesa, born 16 September 1888.

Politics

He was first elected to the House of Commons of Canada as the Conservative MP for Argenteuil in 1904, having failed to defeat Mr. W. C. Edwards for the seat in Russell County during the election of 1900. Perley served as High Commissioner to the United Kingdom and Minister of the Overseas Military Forces in the World War I government of Sir Robert Borden. He did not run for re-election in the 1917 federal election in order to concentrate on his duties in London. He returned to the House of Commons in the 1925 federal election and subsequently served as Secretary of State for Canada in the short-lived 1926 government of Arthur Meighen and then as Minister without Portfolio in the government of R. B. Bennett following the 1930 federal election. He was re-elected in the 1935 federal election which also saw the defeat of Bennett's government, and remained an MP until his death in 1938.

Electoral record 

  
|Liberal
|Thomas Christie, Jr. 
|align="right"| 1,261    || 54.10
  
|Conservative
|George Halsey Perley  
|align="right"|1,070    45.90

References
 
 
 George Halsey Perley fonds, Library and Archives Canada

1857 births
1938 deaths
American emigrants to pre-Confederation Ontario
Businesspeople in timber
High Commissioners of Canada to the United Kingdom
Harvard University alumni
Conservative Party of Canada (1867–1942) MPs
Canadian Knights Grand Cross of the Order of St Michael and St George
Members of the House of Commons of Canada from Quebec
Canadian members of the Privy Council of the United Kingdom
Members of the King's Privy Council for Canada